Jonathan Arnold Hammond (1891 – 1980) was an English footballer.

Career
Hammond played for Butt Lane Star before joining Port Vale in the summer of 1914. He made his debut in the Staffordshire Senior Cup semi-finals, in a 3–3 draw with Birmingham Reserves on 16 November 1914. He became the regular keeper for the club in November 1917 and held on to the #1 jersey until new signing Alfred Bourne took the number 1 spot as the club were re-elected to the English Football League in October 1919. Hammond featured in two Second Division games in 1919–20 and four in 1920–21. During his time at The Old Recreation Ground, Hammond played 48 war league, 11 war cup, 9 Central League, and 2 Staffs Cup games before being released in summer 1921.

Career statistics
Source:

References

1891 births
1980 deaths
Sportspeople from Burslem
English footballers
Association football goalkeepers
Port Vale F.C. players
English Football League players